The 2014–15 season of the Hessenliga, the highest association football league in the German state of Hesse, was the seventh season of the league at tier five (V) of the German football league system and the 37th season overall since establishment of the league in 1978, then as the Oberliga Hessen.

The season started on 1 August 2014 and finished on 6 April 2015.

Final standings 									
The 2014–15 season saw three new clubs in the league, 1. FC Schwalmstadt, TSV Steinbach and SpVgg Oberrad, all promoted from the Verbandsligas while no club had been relegated from the Regionalliga Südwest to the league.

Top goalscorers
The top goal scorers for the season:

Promotion play-offs
Promotion play-offs were held at the end of the season for both the Regionalliga above and the Hessenliga.

To the Regionalliga
The runners-up of the Hessenliga, Oberliga Rheinland-Pfalz/Saar and the Oberliga Baden-Württemberg, TSV Lehnerz, SC Hauenstein and Bahlinger SC, competed for one more spot in the Regionalliga. While the first game had been scheduled the second and third depended on the outcome of the first. Bahlinger SC won promotion to the Regionalliga courtesy to a win and a draw.

To the Hessenliga
The runners-up of the Verbandsliga Nord (Hünfelder SV), Verbandsliga Süd (Rot-Weiss Frankfurt) and Verbandsliga Mitte (Viktoria Kelsterbach) competed for one more spot in the Hessenliga with Rot-Weiss Frankfurt winning promotion.

References

External links 
 Hessenliga on Fupa.net 

Hessenliga seasons
Hessenliga